Mohammad-Javad Abtahi is an Iranian conservative politician who represents Khomeinishahr in the Parliament of Iran. He is a member of Front of Islamic Revolution Stability.

Political Views
In January 2020, he led the support for the designation of the United States The Pentagon as a terrorist organization in response to the assassination of Qasem Soleimani Abathi also advocated against the ability for citizens to have 'other' listed as a religious affiliation on their ID cards as it would infer that the state recognizes a religion other than Islam.

References

1956 births
Living people
Members of the 8th Islamic Consultative Assembly
Members of the 10th Islamic Consultative Assembly
Front of Islamic Revolution Stability politicians